Barton is an unincorporated community in southern Colerain Township, Belmont County, Ohio, United States, along Wheeling Creek.  It has a post office with the ZIP code 43905.

Barton is part of the Wheeling, WV-OH Metropolitan Statistical Area.

History
A post office called Barton has been in operation since 1880. Barton was platted in 1905, and named after Abner Barton, the original owner of the land.  Barton was originally a mining community.

Notable people
Ellis R. Dungan, American director who directed many Tamil films in the 1930s to 50s.
Fraňo Kráľ (1903-1955),  Slovak writer and communist politician born in Barton 
Johnny Pramesa, baseball player

References

Unincorporated communities in Belmont County, Ohio
1880 establishments in Ohio
Populated places established in 1880
Unincorporated communities in Ohio